The Guadalupe caracara (Caracara lutosa) or mourning caracara is an extinct bird of prey belonging to the falcon family (Falconidae).  It was, together with the closely related crested caracara (Caracara plancus), formerly placed in the genus Polyborus. It was also known as the quelili or the calalie.

Distribution and taxonomy
This species inhabited Mexico's Guadalupe Island until the beginning of the 20th century. The crested caracara is sometimes incorrectly referred to as "Guadalupe caracara", because the extinct birds were formerly considered a subspecies of the extant taxon. They were reinstated as a full species in 2000.

History
Described as "evil" and "vicious" by early observers, it was driven to extinction by a hunting and poisoning campaign led by goat herders on Guadalupe Island. As described by Edward Palmer:

Conservation
In 1876 the species was common throughout the island. However, in March 1897, only one bird was encountered, but additional members of the species survived. On 1 December 1900 collector Rollo Beck encountered 11 and preserved nine as scientific specimens. He may have shot the last of the caracaras on Guadalupe Island, believing from their fearlessness and ease of finding them that they were common. There was one more (unconfirmed) sighting in 1903; the bird was certainly gone by 1906.

The Guadalupe caracara is one of the few species that were intentionally rendered extinct by humans. In its particular case, it was demanded by goat farmers that the birds were to be killed off as they occasionally fed on young goats (though the role of the caracara as a predator of goats was much exaggerated). It stands to note that its erstwhile home was at that time being devastated by tens of thousands of goats gone feral, leading to the extinction of several endemic species caused by the near-total destruction of habitat.

In an apparent case of coextinction, the ischnoceran louse Acutifrons caracarensis is only known from the Guadalupe caracara.

Around 35 specimens (skins, skeletons and two eggs) remain in public collections today. Specimens are available for display in Chicago, Washington, and London.

References

Further reading
 Fuller, Errol (2000): Extinct Birds (2nd ed.). Oxford University Press, Oxford, New York. 
 Greenway, James C. Jr. (1967): Guadelupe Island Carcara. In: Extinct and Vanishing Birds of the World (2nd ed.): 183–195. Dover Publications, New York.
 King, Warren B. (ed.) (1981): Endangered Birds of the World; The ICBP Bird Red Data Book: Preamble 8. 

Caracaras
Caracara (genus)
Bird extinctions since 1500
Birds described in 1876
Extinct birds of North America
Taxa named by Robert Ridgway
Species made extinct by deliberate extirpation efforts